Harry Montague Hammond (7 May 1917 – 1 April 1998), professionally known as Happy Hammond, was an Australian comedian, radio host, children's television show host, and television producer.

Biography and broadcasting career 
Happy Hammond was born in the Sydney suburb of Summer Hill, the youngest of three children. His parents were both deaf and mute.

He was famous for his bright personality and wearing a tartan suit and hat, sometimes referred to as his "test pattern" outfit, with colors that clashed in real life but worked well on black-and-white TV. His catchphrase was "Is everybody happy?" along with the theme song for the show, "Happy Days Are Here Again".

The nickname "Happy" came from his time in the Australian Army during World War II. He served in the South West Pacific Area and, following a few concerts, was transferred to the Australian Army Entertainment Unit, the "Boomerangs", entertaining Australian troops in combat areas. He performed in concerts with Keith Glover, who later went on to join the ABC. After the war, the pair took their act to the Tivoli circuit.

Hammond's broadcasting career began in his home town of Geelong when he became the breakfast announcer at 3GL. While there, he made his first TV appearance in 1948, as part of an exhibition using closed-circuit TV equipment for trial purposes. He then moved to Adelaide's 5KA, before returning to Victoria to work first at 3AW and then 3UZ, both in Melbourne. At 3UZ, he hosted The Happy Show, a children's program, as well as partnering Graham Kennedy, following the death of Nicky Whitta in September 1956. Hammond joined television station GTV-9, and shortly after, he invited the young Kennedy to appear on a telethon, where he was noticed by Norman Spencer, leading eventually to Kennedy joining the channel as well.

On TV, the Tarax Happy Show (later the Tarax Show) started on Melbourne's GTV-9 in January 1957, debuting from the Myer Emporium's Lonsdale Street store window. During Hammond's time at GTV-9, the program was only seen in Victoria, where it competed with Young Seven on HSV-7.

Hammond switched to HSV-7 in 1960, where The Happy Show, no longer sponsored by Tarax, featured Princess Panda (Panda Lisner), Lovely Anne (Anne Watt), Parer the Magician (Tommy Parer), Funny Face (Vic Gordon), Big John (John D'Arcy), Robbie Rob (Bob Horsfall), Cousin Roy (Roy Lyons) and Sylvester the Talking Sock (Ian Wiliams). The program was also relayed to ATN-7 in Sydney. During Watt's absence for her honeymoon in early 1965, her place was taken by a young Olivia Newton-John.

Hammond was a keen supporter of the Geelong Football Club in the Victorian Football League. On Grand Final day in 1963, he was accorded the honour of running through the banner with the Geelong players before the game, which Geelong won.

Logie Award
Hammond's program won a Logie Award in 1959 (the Logies' inaugural year) for Most Popular Children's Show, and Hammond himself won a Logie in 1962 for Outstanding Contributions to Children's Entertainment.

After the cancelation of The Happy Show in 1968, Hammond moved to produce daytime television morning shows and afternoon children's shows and, in his later years, had an off-camera role in HSV-7's videotape department, although every year until the 1990s he continued to appear on the station's Royal Children's Hospital Good Friday Appeal. He was occasionally seen on Shirl's Neighbourhood.

Limited footage remains from Happy Hammond's career. The most commonly seen clip is a musical finger-clicking routine. A very small number of kinescopes of The Happy Show are held by the National Film and Sound Archive, despite the heavy Wiping of that era.

References

External links
Monash edu.Australia
Logie Awards
Denzil Howson Archive
Happy Hammond at the National Film and Sound Archive

1917 births
1998 deaths
Australian male comedians
Australian television presenters
Logie Award winners
20th-century Australian comedians
3AW presenters